Shandaken is a town on the northern border of Ulster County, New York, United States, northwest of Kingston, New York.  As of the 2020 census, the town had a total population of 2,866.

History 
The town was first settled around the time of the American Revolution. Shandaken was established as a town in 1804 from part of the Town of Woodstock. 

In 1809, the town was increased by territory from the Town of Neversink (in Sullivan County). Later, some of Shandaken was used to help form the Towns of Denning, Hardenburgh, and Olive. By the final years of the 19th Century, Shandaken had developed the tourist industry which is still the most important part of its economy.

An alternate translation of the native word "shandaken" is the "place of the hemlocks."

The Mount Tremper Fire Observation Station was listed on the National Register of Historic Places in 2001.

Geography
The total area is 0.02% water.

The northern town line is the border of Greene County, and the western town boundary is the border of Delaware County.

The Esopus Creek flows across the town.

Demographics

2020
As of the census of 2000, there were 3,235 people, 1,463 households, and 829 families residing in the town.  The population density was 27.0 people per square mile (10.4/km2).  There were 2,666 housing units at an average density of 22.3 per square mile (8.6/km2).  The racial makeup of the town was 94.65% white, 1.21% African American, 0.40% Native American, 1.17% Asian, 0.12% Pacific Islander, 0.56% from other races, and 1.89% from two or more races. Hispanic or Latino of any race were 3.06% of the population.

There were 1,463 households, out of which 23.6% had children under the age of 18 living with them, 43.0% were married couples living together, 9.8% had a female householder with no husband present, and 43.3% were non-families. 34.4% of all households were made up of individuals, and 14.2% had someone living alone who was 65 years of age or older.  The average household size was 2.17 and the average family size was 2.82.

In the town, the population was spread out, with 20.2% under the age of 18, 5.5% from 18 to 24, 24.2% from 25 to 44, 32.6% from 45 to 64, and 17.4% who were 65 years of age or older.  The median age was 45 years. For every 100 females, there were 98.3 males.  For every 100 females age 18 and over, there were 98.8 males.

The median income for a household in the town was $31,566, and the median income for a family was $40,927. Males had a median income of $38,854 versus $23,063 for females. The per capita income for the town was $21,121.  About 7.4% of families and 12.3% of the population were below the poverty line, including 13.9% of those under age 18 and 7.6% of those age 65 or over.

Services
The town paramedic ambulance service is also provided to residents of the towns of Olive, Lexington, and Westkill. The town also has a police department located at 64 SR 42 in the hamlet of Shandaken; it was originally established as a constabulary, and became a police department in the early 1990s. The police department consists of four full-time and nine part-time members, and is dispatched by through the Ulster County sheriff's office. The sheriff's office has a post located within the town offices located on Route 28, which is not staffed continuously. There are two emergency call boxes located in the town, one on the north-facing side of the town hall (SR 28) and the other on the south-facing side of the town police department (located on SR 42)

The Shandaken Justice Court is a part-time court, housed within the town offices on SR 28; it handles all traffic violations, misdemeanor criminal cases, and civil cases. Traffic court is held every Tuesday with few exceptions.

Communities and locations in Shandaken 
Allaben – a hamlet east of Shandaken village on Route 28. It is the seat of town government.
Beechford – a hamlet in the southeastern corner of the town.
Big Indian – a hamlet southwest of Shandaken village on Route 28 in the Big Indian Valley.
Bushnellsville – a hamlet by the northern town line on Route 42.
Chichester – a hamlet in the eastern part of the town, north of Phoenicia on Route 214. Its roots lay in the manufacture of furniture until the Depression destroyed the business. It was founded in 1863.
Highmount – a location northwest of Pine Hill. It was originally called "Summit".  It was also known as "Grand Hotel Station".
Mt. Pleasant – a hamlet in the eastern part of the town on Route 28 south of Phoenicia. This community was previously called "Longyear" and "Riseley's".
Mt. Tremper – a hamlet near the eastern town line. It was previously called   "Ladew Corners" and "The Corner". The Camp Wapanachki was listed on the National Register of Historic Places in 1994.
Oliverea – a hamlet, founded in 1886, in the southern part of the town on Route 47. It is home to the Winnisook Club, which is located at the base of Slide Mountain next to Winnisook Lake.
Panther Mountain – a roughly circular mountain ridge in the center of the town that is believed to be the result of a meteor impact.
Phoenicia – a hamlet in the eastern part of the town.  It was the first community to be connected to the outside world by a railroad (the Ulster and Delaware Railroad) and the first to begin hotel construction for the tourist industry.
Pine Hill – a hamlet in the western part of the town.
Shandaken – the hamlet of Shandaken is in the north central part of the town on Route 28.
Slide Mountain – Slide Mountain is the highest point in the Catskill Mountains.
Woodland Valley – a hamlet in the southeastern part of the town, south of Phoenicia. It is still home to the Roxmor Colony.

References

External links
 
  Town of Shandaken, NY

 
Catskills
Towns in Ulster County, New York
Towns in the New York metropolitan area